Samuel Schellink (1 August 1876 – 20 December 1958) was a Dutch pottery decorator, painter, engraver, ceramist, pastelist, and author of watercolors and gouaches. His active period was between 1891 and 1958.

Work

Sam Schellink (alias J. Schelling, Sam Schellink, or Schellink Junior) was an autodidact and began his career in Utrecht, where he worked until 1892, when he moved to The Hague. In that same year, he joined 

as a painter apprentice. He would later go on to be the painter of their eggshell porcelain, for which he would become well-known. During this time, he developed the signature topics of his work which include still life, flowers, birds and, less prominently, landscapes. He remained with Rozenburg until 1914, when they went bankrupt.

As a consequence and for a brief period, he focused on painting and entering the art trade. However, in 1918, he joined  in Oegstgeest, where he again worked as a pottery painter.  Schellink's last employer was Plateelbakkerij Goedewaagen in Gouda, where he fulfilled the same role of pottery decorator.

Personal life
In 1901, he married Johanna Sophia Bruens in The Hague, with whom he had a daughter. After the death of his first wife in 1927, he married Wilhelmina Gerardina Johanna Smits, who had been his housekeeper.

Mentions in literature
 Scheen 1969-1970
 Scheen 1981, p. 457 (as: Schellink, Samuel ('Sam')*)
 Jacobs 2000, vol. 5, p. 290 (as: Schellink, Samuel (Sam))
 J. Romijn, 'Rozenburg en Sam Schellink', newsletter of the Vrienden van de Nederlandse Ceramiek nr. 51, 1968, p. 31-34

References

External links

 Samuel Schellink
 Vase at Victoria and Albert Museum

1876 births
1958 deaths
Dutch engravers
Dutch ceramists
19th-century Dutch painters
20th-century Dutch painters
Artists from Utrecht
Artists from The Hague
Dutch male painters
21st-century ceramists
19th-century Dutch male artists
20th-century Dutch male artists